Clarence George "Lal" Hilditch (2 June 1894 – 31 October 1977), also known as Clarrie Hilditch, was an English footballer, and one of only two men to have been simultaneously a player and the manager at Manchester United (the other being Ryan Giggs).

Hilditch was born in Hartford, Cheshire, and began his playing career with Hartford, before moving on to Cheshire League sides Witton Albion and Altrincham. In January 1914 he joined Manchester United as an outside left, but soon changed to his favoured half back position. He featured three times during the 1913/14 season before establishing himself in the team the following term. Although he joined Manchester United during the First World War, he quickly established a name for himself as an astute halfback who was an incredibly clean tackler and read the game well.

In the summer of 1920 he was selected by the Football Association to be part of the 20-man squad that travelled to South Africa for a 14 match tour. Hilditch featured in all three 'tests' against South Africa but it was the closest he came to international recognition.

In October 1926, after John Chapman was suspended for unknown reasons, Hilditch took over the manager's job for the rest of the season in addition to his playing duties.

A stalwart in the United team for over a decade, he played 322 league games scoring 7 league goals before retiring in 1932 without winning any medals with the club.

Managerial statistics

References

External links

Profile at MUFCInfo.com

1894 births
1977 deaths
People from Hartford, Cheshire
English footballers
Association football forwards
Association football midfielders
England wartime international footballers
Altrincham F.C. players
Manchester United F.C. players
English football managers
Manchester United F.C. managers
Sportspeople from Cheshire
Witton Albion F.C. players